Roman Jebavý and Jiří Veselý were the defending champions, but Veselý chose not to participate this year. Jebavý played alongside Florin Mergea, but lost in the first round to Dominic Inglot and Robert Lindstedt.

Inglot and Lindstedt went on to win the title, defeating Ben McLachlan and Nicholas Monroe in the final, 3–6, 6–3, [10–8].

Seeds

Draw

Draw

References

 Main Draw

Istanbul Open - Doubles
2018 in Istanbul
2018 Doubles
2018 in Turkish tennis